XHOK-FM is a radio station on 90.9 FM in Monterrey, Nuevo León. It is owned by Grupo ACIR.

History
XEOK-AM received its concession on June 19, 1948. It broadcast initially on 950 kHz (soon moving to 920) and was owned by Carlos Roa Montes de Oca, who also built a studio-transmitter link for XEOK in the FM band in the late 1950s. XEOK was sold to Radiodifusión Regiomontana, S.A. in 1963, which boosted its power to 1 kW by the 1980s. In the 1990s, XEOK moved from 920 to 900 kHz which allowed a further power increase to 10,000 watts. ACIR concessionaires have owned XEOK since 2000.

For most of the late 2000s and 2010s, XEOK was a news/talk outlet known as "La OK". With ACIR only owning one station in Monterrey, XEOK was selected for second-wave AM-FM migration and signed on XHOK-FM 90.9 in May 2018. In June, the station took on the Radio Disney format, much like its Guadalajara sister station, XHEMIA-FM.

ACIR and Radio Disney parted ways at the end of 2019. Most of the Radio Disney stations were to change to a similar pop format from ACIR known as Match FM, but ACIR opted to flip XHOK to romantic and place XHOK in its Amor network in December.

References

Radio stations in Monterrey
Grupo ACIR